The Punishment of Luxury is the thirteenth studio album by English electronic band Orchestral Manoeuvres in the Dark (OMD), and the third since their 2006 reformation. Produced by OMD, it was released on 1 September 2017 by 100% Records in the UK and White Noise elsewhere. In July of that year, the band commenced a tour of North America and Europe in support of the record.

The Punishment of Luxury met with favourable reviews, and was named as one of the best and most underrated albums of 2017. It debuted at number four on the UK Albums Chart with 9,894 copies sold in its first week, making it the band's first album to reach the top 10 in their home country since 1991's Sugar Tax; the record topped the UK Independent Albums Chart. It reached the top 10 on various European charts, as well as on Billboards Dance/Electronic Albums and Independent Albums charts in the United States.

Background
Toward completion of the gruelling recording sessions for English Electric (2013), there were internal doubts about the band's future. Morale had risen after several months of touring the album, however. Keyboardist Paul Humphreys said in August 2013: "We're already talking about what we should be doing next. We've got a great idea for a new album actually." By the turn of 2015, writing of the album had "started in earnest", with song titles "The Punishment of Luxury" and "Evolution of Species" being announced (the latter did not make the album).

The Punishment of Luxury takes its name from a 1891 painting by Italian artist Giovanni Segantini. In December 2016, OMD frontman Andy McCluskey expounded: "We've taken that idea and extrapolated it into sort of... a metaphor for modern life, really. First world problems. All of the shit we have to deal with is only a problem that's created for you by some suggestion that came from a marketing man or a PR job that's been done on you."

Humphreys said of the album's musical direction: "We're still trying to maintain our connection with our roots, but we've tried to go a bit more, even more stripped-down than English Electric." McCluskey added: "There's a little bit more sort of crunchy industrial sound in a few things, a bit glitchy-er. But you know, the bottom line is that we have a sense of melody that we just can't throw off." In May 2017, McCluskey noted the band's use of "noises and repetitive patterns".

"Robot Man", a song about emotional honesty, is an homage to English musician and producer Daniel Miller. It was inspired by Miller's 1978 composition, "Warm Leatherette".

The track "La Mitrailleuse" (French for "The Machinegun") was released on 15 May; its Henning M. Lederer-directed video is based on the 1915 painting by Christopher R. W. Nevinson after which the song is named. The album's first official single, "Isotype", premiered on 29 May and was made available for digital download and streaming the day after. The album's title track was released as the second single on 19 July. "What Have We Done", the only track on the album to feature Humphreys on lead vocals, was released as the third single on 18 September, along with an extended version of the song. A remixed version of "One More Time" followed on 16 February 2018.

The album's cover art was designed by Liverpool-based artist John Petch.

Reception

The Punishment of Luxury received generally favourable reviews. At Metacritic, which assigns a normalised rating out of 100 to reviews from mainstream critics, the album garnered an average score of 71, based on 10 reviews. Tim Russell of God Is in the TV wrote, "OMD have made arguably the best album of 2017... It's brilliant. It's the first album since 1981's multi-million selling Architecture & Morality on which they've succeeded in perfectly balancing the creative tension between their experimental leanings and their ear for a pop tune to create a cohesive whole." Irish Times critic Jennifer Gannon described the record as "synth-pop at its most charming and effortless", while Tim Sendra of AllMusic called it "another strong showing from a band that could have packed it in years ago and become a nostalgia act, but have instead continued to make fine pop art".

In PopMatters, John Bergstrom said the record's "less-than-fresh" anti-consumerism sentiment renders it a "good album rather than a great one", but noted that much of the material is "on par with the band's best". Lorelei Reddin of the Hampshire Chronicle suggested that The Punishment of Luxury had been misinterpreted and underrated by some critics, writing, "This isn't some banal, [Bill] Hicks-esque "Get a soul!" nuke: it's a plaintive look at the brutal consumerist needle and the damage done. And a bloody terrific record to boot." Particular praise was directed at the six-minute "Ghost Star", which multiple reviewers singled out as the highlight of the album.

The Punishment of Luxury appeared in lists of the best and most underrated albums of 2017. God Is in the TVs Tim Russell later named it one of the 20 greatest albums of the 2010s; in a poll of 3,200 Modern Synthpop readers, it was voted the eighth-best synth-pop album of the decade. John Earls of Classic Pop wrote that "you won't get a better late-period synth-pop classic album" than The Punishment of Luxury. Sirius XM DJ Richard Blade said, "I was stunned when I listened. The problem was not finding something to play but deciding which track to put on first. It was that good."

Musician Craig "Space March" Simmons named The Punishment of Luxury the best synth-pop album of 2017. In 2020, singer Boy George streamed a cover version of "The View from Here" via his Instagram channel, adding that he wished he had written the song.

Track listing

Personnel
Credits adapted from the liner notes of The Punishment of Luxury.

OMD
 OMD – engineering, production, recording
 Andy McCluskey – bass guitar, keyboards, vocals
 Paul Humphreys – keyboards, mixing, vocals
 Martin Cooper – keyboards
 Stuart Kershaw – drums

Additional personnel
 Effection – design
 Mike Marsh – mastering
 Chris Oaten – photography
 John Petch – front cover
 David Watson – backing vocals

Charts

References

External links
 The Punishment of Luxury at OMD

2017 albums
Orchestral Manoeuvres in the Dark albums